Plesiozela patagonica is a moth of the Heliozelidae family. It was described by Ole Karsholt and Niels P. Kristensen in 2003 and is endemic to  Argentina.

References

Moths described in 2003
Endemic fauna of Argentina
Fauna of Argentina
Heliozelidae
Moths of South America
Insects of South America